The 2018 Irish presidential election took place on Friday, 26 October, between 7.00 a.m. and 10.00 p.m. President Michael D. Higgins, who was elected in 2011, was seeking re-election. This was the first time since the 1966 election that an incumbent president faced a contest for a second term. Higgins was re-elected on the first count with nearly 56% of the vote, becoming the first president since Éamon de Valera to win a second term in a contested election (Patrick Hillery (1983) and Mary McAleese (2004) had been re-elected unopposed). He was inaugurated for his second term on 11 November.

The election was held on the same date as a referendum on blasphemy.

Procedure

To stand for election as president, candidates must:
be a citizen of Ireland
be at least 35 years of age
be nominated by:
at least twenty of the 218 serving members of the Houses of the Oireachtas (parliament), or
at least four of the 31 county or city councils, or
themselves, in the case of a former or retiring president who has served one term.

If a member of the Oireachtas or a County or City council nominate more than one candidate, only the first nomination paper received from them will be deemed valid. Presidential elections are conducted in line with Article 12 of the Constitution and under the Presidential Elections Act 1993, as amended. The President of Ireland is elected through Instant-runoff voting. All Irish citizens entered on the current electoral register are eligible to vote. Under the Electoral (Amendment) Act 2011, there is a spending limit by each candidate of €750,000. Candidates who are elected or who reach 12.5% of the vote on their elimination are entitled to a reimbursement of expenses up to €200,000.

Nomination process
On 28 August the Minister for Housing, Planning and Local Government, Eoghan Murphy, signed the order for the presidential election, specifying the nomination period as between 10 a.m. on 30 August and 12 noon on 26 September 2018.

On 10 July 2018, incumbent president Michael D. Higgins declared that he would exercise his right to nominate himself as a candidate for the presidential election.  Higgins had said in 2011 that he intended to serve one term only, but changed his mind over the course of his term. Higgins's website and social media accounts became active on 17 September, having been dormant since his inauguration in November 2011. He formally nominated himself on 24 September.

Sinn Féin was the only party to select a candidate. With 28 Oireachtas members (22 TDs and six Senators), the party could nominate a candidate without the need for additional nominations from independents to reach the requirement of 20 Oireachtas members, as they had required in 2011. Nearly all other parties in the Oireachtas supported the re-election of Michael D. Higgins. People Before Profit declined to support any candidate in the election. Independent TD Michael Fitzmaurice had tried to gather the support of other Independent TDs and Senators to support a candidate, but was unsuccessful. Nineteen were willing to be involved in his effort to find a candidate, one short of the twenty required to be nominated. Eleven Oireachtas members signed a nomination form for Gemma O'Doherty, nine short of the required number.

18 local authorities passed resolutions supporting a particular candidate, while the remaining 13 either passed no resolution or passed a resolution declining to nominate any candidate. Candidates needed the support of at least four local authorities to be a candidate in the election.

Others who had sought a nomination from local authorities were: Norma Burke, William Delaney, Patrick Feeney, John Groarke, Patrick Melly, Marie Goretti Moylan, Sarah Louise Mulligan, Kevin Sharkey, James Smyth, David Doucette, and John O'Hare. Sharkey withdrew his name from consideration during the nomination period, calling for the nomination of Gemma O'Doherty. Senator Gerard Craughwell had said that he would seek the nomination if Higgins were otherwise to be unopposed. However, in July he announced that he would not contest the presidential election, in light of Sinn Féin's decision to run a candidate. He also cited the financial costs of running for the presidency as a factor in his decision not to contest the election. Despite Fianna Fáil support for the incumbent Michael D. Higgins, a few of the party's Councillors urged the leadership to nominate Galway West TD Éamon Ó Cuív, but he declined to allow his name to proceed as he would risk his party membership.

Candidates
Six candidates contested the presidential election, having been selected by their parties or having received sufficient council nominations.
Peter Casey, a businessman from Derry who formerly appeared on the Irish version of the television series, Dragons' Den for the show's fifth and sixth series.
Gavin Duffy, businessman from Kildare and has been a dragon on Dragons' Den since it first broadcast in 2009.
Joan Freeman, founded Pieta House, a suicide intervention charity, in 2006. She served as its director until 2014. In 2016, she was nominated by the Taoiseach as a member of Seanad Éireann, sitting as an Independent. She was supported by Rural Independent TDs Michael Collins, Michael Harty and Mattie McGrath.
Seán Gallagher, a businessman from Cavan who came second in the 2011 presidential election. He was a dragon investor in the first three seasons of Dragons' Den.
Michael D. Higgins, incumbent president. 
Liadh Ní Riada, MEP for South since 2014, was confirmed as the Sinn Féin candidate on 16 September.

Debates

Opinion and exit polling

Result
The count began at 09:00 on Saturday 27 October.

Constituency results

Analysis
The Irish Times'''s analysis of its exit poll data said that Michael D. Higgins seemed on course to be comfortably re-elected on the first count, after leading in the opinion polls throughout the campaign, despite "considerable criticism over his use of the Government jet, expensive hotel accommodation on overseas visits and the lack of transparency over how an annual €300,000 allowance for his office was spent". It attributed the expected low turnout to "a lack of public enthusiasm for the contest that was evident throughout the campaign".

It ascribed Peter Casey's second place to a late surge of support following his criticisms of Travellers and his claim that Ireland had "a growing culture of welfare dependency", and it added that at some polling stations pollsters reported that "he was attracting as many voters as Mr Higgins". It said that Seán Gallagher appeared to be down 22% on his 2011 figure of 29%, but that the biggest disappointment would probably be for Sinn Féin, whose candidate Liadh Ní Riada's expected 8% was well down on its general election result, and only a third of the party's support in the latest Irish Times/Ipsos MRBI Opinion poll. It described Senator Joan Freeman's expected performance as "just 6 per cent of the vote", and Gavin Duffy's expected result as him having "flopped completely, ending a miserable campaign with just 2 per cent of the vote".

When analysing the Red C/RTÉ exit poll, RTÉ Political Correspondent Martina Fitzgerald said that the data showed that President Higgins was very popular among voters regardless of age and gender but was particularly popular among women and younger votes despite the debate about his age, which most voters saw as irrelevant. The most important factor cited by voters was the candidates' track record and expertise, while the finances and salary of the president were the least important factor.

Fitzgerald added that "the real political story" was that the result was "a disastrous election" for Sinn Féin, and "a serious blow" for which party leader Mary Lou McDonald would have to take "full responsibility". Fitzgerald also noted that the combined total of the three former Dragons Den judges (Casey, Gallagher, and Duffy) was very similar to Gallagher's vote in 2011, suggesting that vote had held up, but that Casey had taken most of it this time.

References

External links
 Presidential Election 2018 – Presidential Returning Officer
 TheJournal.ie - #Aras 2018 #Aras 18
 The Irish Times'' - Presidential Election
 RTÉ.ie - Presidential Election
 RTÉ - candidate video pitches web page

Campaign websites
Peter Casey
Gavin Duffy
Joan Freeman
Sean Gallagher
Michael D. Higgins
Liadh Ní Riada 

Presidential elections in Ireland
2018 elections in the Republic of Ireland
2018 in Irish politics
October 2018 events in Ireland